Gambang is a town in Kuantan District, Pahang, Malaysia. It is located at a junction between Federal Route 2, MEC Highway (Federal Route 222) and Tun Razak Highway (Federal Route 12). The Malaysia Electric Corporation (MEC) town (Bandar MEC) and electrical appliances manufacturing factory is located here. It is accessible via the Gambang Interchange of the East Coast Expressway (ECE) .

Education
Gambang had been developed to be an Education City since the past ten years starting with the building of Kolej Universiti Kejuruteraan dan Teknologi Malaysia (KUKTEM) or now known as Universiti Malaysia Pahang. After Universiti Malaysia Pahang was built, the Federal Government under the Ministry of Education had formed a foundation college here in Gambang, namely Kolej Matrikulasi Pahang, with their first intake on 5 April 2003.

Currently, the government is in the process of building a Universiti Teknologi MARA's branch in Gambang. The project had just been started. On the same time, the government builds the permanent pre-university campus of International Islamic University Malaysia. Even though the campus is expected to be completed in 2016, the campus is expected to start its operation in January 2014.

Other than universities and colleges, a Sport's school is also here in Gambang. Sekolah Sukan Pahang (or known by the locals as Sekolah Sukan Gambang) is the third Sport's School formed after Sekolah Sukan Bukit Jalil and Sekolah Sukan Tunku Mahkota Ismail. The school is located directly in front of Universiti Malaysia Pahang main entrance. Akademi Bolasepak Negara Mokhtar Dahari, a football academy for young talent is located adjacent to Sekolah Sukan Pahang, starting its first intake in 2018.

Attractions

Gambang is a small town outside Pahang's capital, Kuantan. The main attraction here in Gambang is the Bukit Gambang Resort City. Currently, Bukit Gambang Resort City houses to apartments building, hotels and a water-recreational centre. Located 8 km from Universiti Malaysia Pahang, Bukit Gambang Resort City is a tourist attraction in and outside of Malaysia.

Other than the resort, Pusat Rekreasi Sungai Pancing (Pancing River Recreational Centre) is also located here. It's a waterfall outside of the jungle in Gambang and a popular spot for the locals to spend their weekends.

During Ramadhan (Muslim's fasting month), there will be a bazaar held in Gambang. It sells a wide variety of food from traditional cakes to dessert. The bazaar will be opened at Gambang's main crossroad, located 2 Kilometres from the Gambang's toll gate.

References

Kuantan District
Towns in Pahang